Sir Michael Alan Supperstone (born 30 March 1950), styled The Hon. Mr Justice Supperstone, is a former judge of the High Court of England and Wales.

He was educated at St Paul's School, London, and Lincoln College, Oxford.

He was called to the bar at Middle Temple in 1973 and became a bencher there in 1999. He was made a QC in 1991, deputy judge of the High Court from 1998 to 2010, and judge of the High Court of Justice (Queen's Bench Division) since 2010. He received the customary knighthood on appointment. From 2017 he was judge in charge of the Administrative Court. On 31 March 2020, he retired from the High Court.

Supperstone was a member of the barristers' chambers 11 King's Bench Walk. He presided over the long-running case involving The Consulting Association, which admitted blacklisting construction workers over union activities. The proceedings were brought by the blacklisted workers.

Bibliography

References

1950 births
Living people
People educated at St Paul's School, London
Alumni of Lincoln College, Oxford
Members of the Middle Temple
Queen's Bench Division judges
Knights Bachelor